Bloomfield Junior Senior High School is a public high school in Bloomfield, Indiana, United States that was established in 1850. It is part of Bloomfield School District in Bloomfield, Indiana, USA, and serves approximately 350 students from the community of Bloomfield, Indiana. The school mascot is the cardinal and the colors are red and white. The school does not have a football team.

See also
 List of high schools in Indiana

References

External links
 

Schools in Greene County, Indiana
Public high schools in Indiana
Public middle schools in Indiana
1850 establishments in Indiana